Agbia was an ancient city and diocese in the Roman province of Africa Proconsularis. It is currently a Roman Rite Catholic titular see.

Antiquity 
Agbia was located at the site of modern Aïn-Hedia in Tunisia.

It had a bishop, who was suffragan to the Metropolitan Archbishop of Carthage.

Titular see 
The bishopric was nominally revived in 1916 as a titular see of the lowest (episcopal) rank in 1916, and has several, near-consecutive incumbents, but underwent name changes of the see during the first incumbency: Agae > (1925) > Aga > (1933) Agbia 

 Michele Godlewski (later Archbishop) (1916.10.21 – 1949.01.14)
 Inácio João Dal Monte, O.F.M. Cap. (1949.03.15 – 1952.05.21)
 Alfonso Zaplana Bellizza (1952.07.14 – 1957.12.17)
 Bartholomew Kim Hyeon-bae (김현배 바르톨로메오) (1957.01.26 – 1960.04.30)
 Leo Lemay, S.M. (1960.06.14 – 1966.11.15)
 António Valente da Fonseca (1967.01.10 – 1971.01.27)
 Jakob Mayr (1971.03.12 – 2010.09.19)
 Pedro Cunha Cruz (51) (2010.11.24 – 2015.05.20)
 Uriah Ashley  (2015.06.25 – ...), Auxiliary Bishop of Panama

Source and external link 
 GigaCatholic, with incumbent biography links

Catholic titular sees in Africa